Xesturida is a genus of rove beetles in the family Staphylinidae. There is at least one described species in Xesturida, X. laevis.

References

Further reading

 
 
 
 

Aleocharinae
Articles created by Qbugbot